Ladakh Chale Rickshawala is a 64-minute Indian film helmed by Indrani Chakraborty about Satyen Das' exploration of Ladakh from Kolkata on his rickshaw, a three-wheeled passenger cart. The documentary drama was released in February 2019. Music directed by Amit Bose and Yash Gupta.

Synopsis 
In 2014, Satyen Das, a 44-year old rickshaw puller from Kolkata, India undertook the 65-day long 3,000 km long journey from Kolkata to Ladakh on his three-wheeled passenger cart. Das traveled through Jharkhand, Uttar Pradesh, Kargil and Srinagar to reach Ladakh.

Awards 
2018: Best Exploration / Adventure Film, National Film Awards

References 

2019 documentary films
Indian docudrama films
Ladakh
2019 films